Rugby Europe is the administrative body for rugby union in Europe. It was formed in 1999 to promote, develop, organise, and administer the game of rugby in Europe under the authority of World Rugby (the sport's global governing body). However, it is not responsible for the organisation of the Six Nations Championship or the competitions run by European Professional Club Rugby (the European Rugby Champions Cup and Challenge Cup).

The predecessor to Rugby Europe was the Fédération Internationale de Rugby Amateur (FIRA), which was established in 1934 to administer rugby union in Europe outside the authority of the International Rugby Football Board (as World Rugby was then called), and came to spread outside the continent. FIRA agreed to come under the auspices of World Rugby in the 1990s, and appended 'Association Européenne de Rugby' to its name in a return to being a European body. In 2014 the organisation was renamed Rugby Europe as part of a re-branding.

After the 2022 Russian invasion of Ukraine, Rugby Europe suspended Russia from international and European continental rugby union competition. In addition, the Rugby Union of Russia was suspended from Rugby Europe.

Member unions
Rugby Europe has 47 member unions as of December 2021. Not all European member unions are members of World Rugby. Rugby Europe's members are listed below, with the year each union joined World Rugby shown in brackets.
 
Forty World Rugby members are part of Rugby Europe:

Seven members of Rugby Europe are not affiliated with World Rugby:

Six European nations are not currently affiliated with Rugby Europe or World Rugby:

Notes:

History

FIRA (1934–1999) 
In 1931, the French Rugby Federation (FFR) was suspended from playing against the other IRFB  nations, because the sport's authorities had suspected for many years that the (FFR) was allowing the abuse of the rules on amateurism.
As a result, Fédération Internationale de Rugby Amateur (FIRA) was founded in 1934.
It was designed to organise rugby union outside the authority of the International Rugby Football Board (as it was known at the time). The founder members were Italy, France, Spain, Belgium, Portugal, Catalonia, Romania, Holland and Germany. In 1941 the Spanish dictator Francisco Franco forcibly merged Catalonia's team into the Spanish rugby team. Nowadays the Catalan Federation is trying unsuccessfully to reverse this decision, claiming the historical rights as a founder member.

In 1965, FIRA inaugurated the FIRA Nation's Cup, and in 1974 the FIRA Championship, later renamed the European Nations Cup (ENC). The ENC provided international competition for European countries outside the Five Nations. The ENC was played in three divisions, comprising most countries in Continental Europe. The ENC later expanded its horizons, taking in Morocco and Tunisia.
The ENC first division competition was won most often by France, but Romania won it five times, and Italy once, in its last edition, in 1995–1997. France and Italy no longer play in the ENC, as both countries now play in the Six Nations Championship.

FIRA–AER (1999–2014) 
In the 1990s, FIRA recognised the IRB as the governing body of rugby union worldwide and after negotiations with the IRB, it agreed to integrate itself within the organisation. In 1999, it changed its name to "FIRA – Association of European Rugby" (FIRA–AER), to promote and rule over rugby union in the European area and to run the junior world championship. FIRA-AER organised both the under-19 and under-21 world championships until IRB folded them into the competitions now known as the World Rugby Under 20 Championship and World Rugby Under 20 Trophy in 2008.

Rugby Europe (2014–present) 
In June 2014, during the annual convention of FIRA-AER in Split, it was decided to rename the organisation to Rugby Europe to provide it with a shorter, more recognisable name.

Rugby Europe international competitions 
The highest level of rugby competition played among European countries is the Six Nations Championship, contested every year in February and March by the tier-1 European nations: England, France, Ireland, Italy, Scotland and Wales. The tournament is the oldest international rugby tournament in the world, having begun in 1883, and has been known as the Six Nations Championship since 2000, when Italy joined; it had previously been known as the Home Nations and the Five Nations. There is no promotion or relegation, and since 2000, no country has entered or left the Six Nations. Rugby Europe is not responsible for the organisation of the Six Nations Championship, which is run by the national unions of its participating nations.

The next level of international rugby, played by tier-2 and tier-3 European countries, is the Rugby Europe International Championships. It is made up of five levels or divisions: Championship, Trophy, Conference 1, Conference 2 and Development. Each division consists of five, six, or eight teams, and is played on a round robin format for a one-year cycle, with promotion and relegation between levels and the end of the season. As of 2023, the top division Rugby Europe Championship is contested by eight countries – Belgium, Georgia, Germany, the Netherlands, Poland, Portugal, Romania, and Spain. Of these countries, all but two (Belgium and Poland) have played in a Rugby World Cup and are routinely ranked in the Top 30 in the world. Other countries that have participated in past editions include the Czech Republic and Ukraine.

Other international competitions

Senior Men 
Men XV
 Rugby Europe International Championships
 Championship
 Trophy
 Conference 1 (2 Conferences: North and South)
 Conference 2 (2 Conferences: North and South)
 Development
 Rugby World Cup 2023 Qualifier
Men VII
 Rugby Europe Sevens
 Championship Series
 Trophy
 Conference 1
 Conference 2
 2020 Olympics Rugby Europe Men's Sevens Qualifier
Snow rugby
 Rugby Europe Snow Rugby Men's European Championship 
Beach rugby
 European Beach Five Men's Rugby Championships

Senior Women 
Women XV
 Rugby Europe Women's Championship
 Championship
 Trophy
 2021 Rugby World Cup qualifier(1) 
Women VII
 Rugby Europe Women's Sevens
 Championship Series
 Trophy
 Conference
 2020 Olympics Rugby Europe's Women's Sevens Qualifier
Snow rugby
 Rugby Europe Snow Rugby Women's European Championship
Beach rugby
 European Beach Five Women's Rugby Championships

Youth 
Men XV
 Rugby Europe Under-20 Championship
 Rugby Europe Under-18 Championship
Men VII
 Rugby Europe Under-18 Sevens Championship
 Championship Series
 Trophy
Women VII
 Rugby Europe Women’s Under-18 Sevens Championship
 Championship Series
 Trophy

Rugby Europe club competitions 
The highest levels of European club competition played in Europe are the European Rugby Champions Cup and Challenge Cup. These tournaments are contested every year by clubs from the tier-1 European nations: England, France, Ireland, Italy, Scotland and Wales.  Rugby Europe is not responsible for the organisation of these competitions, which is run by the European Professional Club Rugby.

Some European clubs from tier-2 and tier-3 European nations participated in the European Shield, which made up the third-tier club competition below the now defunct Heineken Cup and European Challenge Cup. This competition, which was organised solely by European Rugby Cup Ltd, ran from 2002 to 2005 and was primarily made up of tier-1 nations club teams that were knocked out in the first round of the European Challenge Cup, with the addition of one or two teams from tier-2 and tier-3 European nations (Spain, Portugal, and Romania) invited to make up the numbers.

From 2014 to 2019 clubs from tier-2 and tier-3 European countries competed in the European Rugby Continental Shield from 2014 to 2019. This competition was a joint venture between Rugby Europe, European Professional Club Rugby, and the Federazione Italiana Rugby and it provided the winners of this tournament entry into the European Rugby Challenge Cup.

In 2021 Rugby Europe set up the Rugby Europe Super Cup which enabled clubs from tier-2 and tier-3 European countries to participate annually. Teams are divided into two conferences: western and eastern. Each team will play every conference rival home and away. The two best teams from each conference will advance to the semi-finals, where they will compete to play in the final. Currently there are eight clubs involved but this is expected to rise to sixteen by 2025.

World Rugby Rankings

Professional competitions

The following table shows the professional rugby union competitions in various European countries.

Notes:
 Average attendances vary significantly by country within the Pro14—Ireland (12,347), Wales (8,136), Scotland (4,570), and Italy (2,744).
 The English Premiership and French Top 14 both turned professional in 1996. Two Italian teams joined the Celtic League (since renamed Pro12) in 2010.
 England's second-level Championship became fully professional in 2009 after having been semi-professional.

References

External links 
 rugbyeurope.eu

 

Sports governing bodies in Europe
Sports organizations established in 1934
1934 establishments in Europe
Organizations based in Paris